The term shell theory may refer to:

 The shell theorem of fields and potentials due to a spherically symmetrical body
 Part of the theory of plates and shells in continuum mechanics
 The membrane theory of shells in continuum mechanics
 The nuclear shell model in quantum mechanics